Khalil Alexander Paden (born October 5, 1989) is an American gridiron football wide receiver who is currently a free agent. He played college football at San Jose State and Northern Arizona. He has also been a member of the Sacramento Mountain Lions, Calgary Stampeders, Orlando Predators and Ottawa Redblacks.

Early years
Paden played high school football for the Cleveland High School Cavaliers of Reseda, California. He played quarterback and running back for the Cavaliers, scoring thirteen touchdowns, while earning all-league honors as a defensive back. He was selected for the Daily News All-Star Game. Paden also lettered in track and field and basketball, garnering all-city recognition as a sprinter in track and field.

College career
Paden played for the San Jose State Spartans of San Jose State University from 2008 to 2009, recording six receptions for 56 yards. He was redshirted in 2007.

He played for the Northern Arizona Lumberjacks of Northern Arizona University from 2010 to 2011. He led the Lumberjacks with 61 receptions for 991 yards and eight touchdowns his senior year in 2011, earning All-Big Sky honorable mention honors. He recorded twenty receptions for 200 yards and one touchdown his junior season in 2010.

Professional career

Sacramento Mountain Lions
Paden spent the 2012 season with the Sacramento Mountain Lions of the United Football League.

Calgary Stampeders
Paden was signed by the Calgary Stampeders (CFL) on June 4, 2013. He was released by the Stampeders on June 22, 2013.

Orlando Predators
Paden was signed by the Orlando Predators on February 7, 2014. Paden finished his rookie season with the Orlando Predators with 81 catches for 1,401 yards and 23 touchdowns. He finished the season ninth in the league in receiving yards and first in yards per catch with an average of 17.3. His mark of 17.3 yards per catch was sixth best in Arena Football League history as of the 2014 season.

Ottawa Redblacks
Paden signed with the Ottawa Redblacks (CFL) on August 5, 2014. Paden was released by the Redblacks on October 5, 2016, partially through the 2016 CFL season. On October 10, Paden was resigned to the active roster. In three seasons in Ottawa, Paden appeared in 19 games. In total, he caught 39 passes for 629 yards with 1 touchdown in the regular season. He also had a touchdown catch in the 2016 Eastern Conference Championship game. Following the 2016 season, he was not re-signed by the club and became a free agent on February 14, 2017.

Toronto Argonauts 
After a week as a free agent, Paden and the Toronto Argonauts (CFL) agreed to a contract.

References

External links
Toronto Argonauts profile 
Just Sports Stats
San Jose State Spartans bio
NFL Draft Scout

Living people
1989 births
American football wide receivers
Canadian football wide receivers
African-American players of American football
African-American players of Canadian football
San Jose State Spartans football players
Northern Arizona Lumberjacks football players
Sacramento Mountain Lions players
Calgary Stampeders players
Orlando Predators players
Ottawa Redblacks players
Toronto Argonauts players
Players of American football from Los Angeles
People from Granada Hills, Los Angeles
21st-century African-American sportspeople
20th-century African-American people